Mount Lebanon is a mountain range in the Lebanese Republic, a nation in the Middle East.

Mount Lebanon may also refer to:
Mount Lebanon Governorate, a political region in modern Lebanon
Mount Lebanon Mutasarrifate, one of the former Ottoman Empire's subdivisions
Mount Lebanon Emirate

In the United States:
Mount Lebanon, a spur peak of Holy Mount, located in western Massachusetts 
Mount Lebanon, Louisiana, a town
Mount Lebanon, New Jersey, an unincorporated community
Mt. Lebanon, Pennsylvania, a suburb of Pittsburgh
Mount Lebanon Shaker Society in New Lebanon, New York
Mount Lebanon Elementary School, a public elementary school in Lebanon, New Hampshire